Sommarøy Bridge is a cantilever bridge connecting the islands of Kvaløya and Sommarøy in the Hillesøy area of Tromsø Municipality in Troms og Finnmark county, Norway.

Sommarøy Bridge has traffic lights to prevent accidents on the narrow bridge, although it has been reported that the traffic lights malfunction in windy weather.

References

External links

A picture of Sommarøy Bridge

Road bridges in Troms og Finnmark
Buildings and structures in Tromsø